Nationality words link to articles with information on the nation's poetry or literature (for instance, Irish or France).

Events

Works published

Great Britain
 Anonymous, Boccus and Sydrake, publication year uncertain but sometime from this year to 1537, edited by John Twyne, an encyclopedia in dialogue form, derived from the Old French Sidrac, in which Boccus asks 847 questions and Sidrac answers them (see Sidrak and Bokkus).
 Anonymous, Sir Isumbras, publication year uncertain, a romance of separation and reunion of family members, based on the Saint Eustace legend; composed in tail-rhyme in the early 14th century
 Anonymous, Sir Lamwell, publication year uncertain but thought to be from this year to 1532; a version of an Authurian "fairy mistress" tale from Marie de France's Lai de Lanval, written in the second half of the 12th century
 Alexander Barclay, translator, Eclogues, publication year uncertain; translated from De miseria curialium of Enea Silvio de Piccolomini (Pope Pius II)); see also  1521 and Fifth Eclogue 1518

Italy
 Pietro Bembo, Italy:
 Gli Asolani, a dialogue on courtly love, with poems reminiscent of Boccaccio and Petrarch; second, revised edition (see also first edition 1505)
 Rime, in Italian
 Girolamo Fracastoro, also known as "Fracastorius", Syphilis sive morbus gallicus ("Syphilis, or The French Disease"), an epic poem in five books about a shepherd named Syphilus; the name for syphilis is derived from the work; the poem suggests using mercury and Oil of guaiac as a cure
 Jacopo Sannazaro, Sonetti e Canzoni
 Antonio Tebaldeo, Di M. Antonio Tebaldeo ferrarese l'opere d'amore, published in Venice; Italy

Other
 Hans Sachs, Das Schlaraffenland, satirical, humorous anecdotes, called "Schwanke", in doggerel verse, Germany

Births
Death years link to the corresponding "[year] in poetry" article:
 November 1 – Étienne de La Boétie (died 1563), French political philosopher and sonnet writer
 Baltasar del Alcázar, (died 1606), Spanish
 François de Belleforest (died 1582), French poet and translator
 Pey de Garros (died 1585), French Occitan language poet writing in Gascon
 Jerónimo Bermúdez (died 1599), Spanish dramatist, poet, and playwright
 Diogo Bernardes born about this year (died c. 1605), brother of Frei Agostinho da Cruz, Portuguese
 Jean de la Ceppede (died 1622), French
 Jan Kochanowski (died 1584), Pole who published poetry in Polish and Latin
 Judah Moscato  (died 1593), Italian rabbi, poet, and philosopher
 Giovanni Battista Pigna (died 1575), Italian, Latin-language poet
 William Stevenson (died 1575), English poet, author and clergyman; presumed playwright

Deaths
Birth years link to the corresponding "[year] in poetry" article:
 April 27 (one source states August 6) – Jacopo Sannazaro died (born 1458), Italian poet,  humanist and epigrammist who also wrote in Neapolitan and Latin
 April 28 – Niklaus Manuel (born 1484), Swiss, German-language poet
 Also:
 probably late 1529 or early this year – Juan del Encina (born 1468), Spanish poet, musician and playwright
 Molla, also known as "Mollamamba", both popular names of Atukuri Molla (born 1440), Indian woman poet who wrote Telugu Ramayan

See also

 Poetry
 16th century in poetry
 16th century in literature
 French Renaissance literature
 Renaissance literature
 Spanish Renaissance literature

Notes

16th-century poetry
Poetry